The World Figure Skating Championships is an annual figure skating competition sanctioned by the International Skating Union in which figure skaters compete for the title of World Champion.

Men's and ladies' competitions took place from January 27 to 28 in Vienna, Austria. Pairs' competition took place on January 21 also in Kristiania, Norway.

Results

Men

Judges:
 J. H. Clarke 
 Hans Pfeiffer 
 O. Sampe 
 Otto Schöning 
 Josef Feller

Ladies

Judges:
 Hans Pfeiffer 
 Otto Petterson 
 Otto Schöning 
 J. H. Clarke 
 Josef Feller

Pairs

Judges:
 August Anderberg 
 Sakari Ilmanen 
 Knut Aarn Meinich 
 Per Thorén 
 Herbert Ramon Yglesias

Sources
 Result List provided by the ISU

World Figure Skating Championships
World Figure Skating Championships
World Figure Skating Championships
World Figure Skating Championships
International figure skating competitions hosted by Austria
International figure skating competitions hosted by Norway
1923 in Norwegian sport
1923 in Austrian sport
1920s in Vienna
January 1923 sports events